Spinal mobilization is a type of passive movement of a spinal segment or region. It is usually performed with the aim of achieving a therapeutic effect.

Spinal mobilization has been described as "a gentle, often oscillatory, passive movement applied to a spinal region or segment so as gently to increase the passive range of motion of that segment or region."

Types of techniques 

Spinal mobilization employ a range of techniques or schools of approaches in delivering the passive movement. Some examples include

 Maitland Technique
 Mulligan Technique

See also 

 Joint mobilization
 Joint manipulation
 Spinal manipulation
 Orthopedic medicine
 Osteopathic Manipulative Medicine
 Chiropractic
 Physical therapy
 Occupational Therapy

References 

Manual therapy
Chiropractic treatment techniques
Osteopathy
Physical therapy
Osteopathic manipulative medicine